The Ministry of Communications of Iraq (MoC) is the federal government ministry concerned with providing basic telecommunications services to the public, government, and businesses. The MoC provides postal service to the general public and manages postal savings accounts. It also runs the State Company for Internet Services and represents Iraq at international organization such as the International Telecommunication Union (ITU) and the Universal Postal Union (IPU).

See also
 National Communications and Media Commission of Iraq

References

External links
 Iraq Ministry of Communications official website

Communications
Communications in Iraq
Iraq